Maxillaria vernicosa, the varnished maxillaria, is a species of orchid found in southeastern and southern Brazil.

References

External links 

vernicosa
Endemic orchids of Brazil